Trachoma speciosum, commonly known as the showy spectral orchid, is an epiphytic or lithophytic orchid that forms clumps with many thick, cord-like roots, between four and eight thick, leathery leaves and many short-lived, cream-coloured flowers with an orange and white labellum. This orchid occurs in tropical North Queensland.

Description 
The side lobes are erect, fleshy and triangular and the middle lobe has a short spur. Flowering occurs from December to May.

Taxonomy and naming
Trachoma speciosum was first formally described in 1989 by David Jones, Bruce Gray, Mark Clements and Jeffrey Wood and the description was published in Australian Orchid Research. The specific epithet (speciosum) is a Latin word meaning "beautiful", "handsome", "splendid" or "showy".

Distribution and habitat
The showy spectral orchid grows on trees near the edges of rainforest, and on emergent hoop pine (Araucaria cunninghamii) in drier rainforest. It is found between the Iron and McIlwraith Ranges in Queensland.

References

speciosum
Orchids of Australia
Plants described in 1989